Gemmersdorf is a village in Austria with 687 inhabitants and is a district of the municipality Sankt Andrä. It's situated on the Gemmersdorfer Straße at the foot of Koralpe, six kilometres east of Sankt Andrä.

Public Institutions
Local Fire Brigade Gemmersdorf
Chapel of ease Gemmersdorf

Villages in Carinthia (state)